1054 Forsytia  is a dark background asteroid, approximately 46 kilometers in diameter, from the outer regions of the asteroid belt. It was discovered on 20 November 1925, by astronomer Karl Reinmuth at the Heidelberg-Königstuhl State Observatory in southwest Germany and assigned provisional designation . It is named after the flowering plant forsythia, and marks the beginning of a sequence of 28 thematically named asteroids by the discoverer.

Orbit and classification 

Forsytia is a non-family asteroid from the main belt's background population. It orbits the Sun in the outer asteroid belt at a distance of 2.5–3.3 AU once every 5.00 years (1,826 days; semi-major axis of 2.92 AU). Its orbit has an eccentricity of 0.14 and an inclination of 11° with respect to the ecliptic. The body's observation arc begins with its official discovery observation in November 1925.

Naming 

This minor planet was named after forsythia, a genus of flowering shrubs in the family Oleaceae. The official naming citation was mentioned in The Names of the Minor Planets by Paul Herget in 1955.

Reinmuth's flowers 

Due to his many discoveries, Karl Reinmuth submitted a large list of 66 newly named asteroids in the early 1930s. This list also contained a sequence of 28 asteroids, starting with this asteroid, that were all named after plants, in particular flowering plants (also see list of minor planets named after animals and plants).

Physical characteristics 

Forsytia is an assumed carbonaceous C-type asteroid.

Rotation period 

In March 2002, a rotational lightcurve of Forsytia was obtained from photometric observations by American amateur astronomer John Gross at his Sonoran Skies Observatory in Arizona. Lightcurve analysis gave a well-defined rotation period of 7.650 hours with a brightness amplitude of 0.23 magnitude.

Diameter and albedo 

According to the surveys carried out by the Infrared Astronomical Satellite IRAS, the Japanese Akari satellite and the NEOWISE mission of NASA's Wide-field Infrared Survey Explorer, Forsytia measures between 42.867 and 53.04 kilometers in diameter and its surface has an albedo between 0.035 and 0.0750. The Collaborative Asteroid Lightcurve Link derives an albedo of 0.0592 and a diameter of 45.42 kilometers based on an absolute magnitude of 10.4.

References

External links 
 Lightcurve Database Query (LCDB), at www.minorplanet.info
 Dictionary of Minor Planet Names, Google books
 Asteroids and comets rotation curves, CdR – Geneva Observatory, Raoul Behrend
 Discovery Circumstances: Numbered Minor Planets (1)-(5000) – Minor Planet Center
 
 

001054
Discoveries by Karl Wilhelm Reinmuth
Named minor planets
19251120